Mount Wonalancet is a  mountain in the town of Waterville Valley, New Hampshire, overlooking the unincorporated communities of Wonalancet and Ferncroft. It is named after Wonalancet, a 17th-century sachem of the Pennacook, a Native American people. Mount Wonalancet lies in Grafton County, immediately west of the Carroll County border, the county in which Ferncroft and Wonalancet are located.

To its immediate north and sharing the same massif is Hibbard Mountain. The pair lie between popular Mount Chocorua to the east,  Mount Passaconaway to the north, and Mount Whiteface to the west. Along with Mount Paugus, due east, the group makes up the easternmost mountains of the Sandwich Range, the southernmost of the White Mountains. To the south, the Sandwich Range is bordered by the Ossipee Mountains immediately north of Lake Winnipesaukee.

The most popular access is via the Mast Trail out of the Ferncroft parking area.

See also

 List of mountains of New Hampshire

References

External links
 
 Mt. Wonalancet at Peakbagger.org

Mountains of New Hampshire
Mountains of Grafton County, New Hampshire
New Hampshire placenames of Native American origin